The Seamus Heaney Centre is located at Queen's University Belfast, and named after the late Seamus Heaney, recipient of the 1995 Nobel Prize in Literature. Heaney graduated from Queens in 1961 with a First Class Honours in English language and literature.

It was officially opened in February 2004 and its founding director was the poet and Queen's graduate Ciaran Carson. Carson retired as director in 2016 and was replaced by Fran Brearton and then by Glenn Patterson.

On 30 April 2009, it gave Heaney a 70th birthday party involving a literary evening.

First Collection Poetry Prize 
The prize is awarded to a poet whose first collection of poetry has been published in the previous year by a UK- or Ireland-based publisher.  It is part of the Seamus Heaney Legacy Project funded by Atlantic Philanthropies. The winner receives £5,000 and is invited to give the Tom Quinlan Lecture in Poetry at New York University with travel accommodation and a $1,000 honorarium included.

Previous recipients of the Prize are:
 2022 - Victoria Kennefick for Eat or We Both Starve (Carcanet 2021)
 2021 - Sumita Chakraborty for Arrow (Carcanet, 2020)
 2020 - Laura Scott for So Many Rooms (Carcanet, 2019)
 2019 - Ned Denny for Unearthly Toys (Carcanet)
 2018 - Richard Osmond for Useful Verses (Picador Poetry);
 2017 - Adam Crothers for Several Deer (Carcanet)
 2016 - Kate Miller for The Observances (Carcanet)
 2015 - Fiona Benson for Bright Travellers (Cape Poetry)
 2014 - Tara Bergin for This is Yarrow (Carcanet)
 2013 - Sarah Jackson for Pelt (Bloodaxe Books)

References

External links

Poetry organizations
Queen's University Belfast
Irish poetry
2004 establishments in Ireland
Organizations established in 2004
Irish writers' organisations